Lal  Weerasinghe (born 17 December 1953 as ලාල් වීරසිංහ [Sinhala]), is an actor in Sri Lankan cinema. One of the popular actors in 1990s of Sinhala cinema, Weerasinghe is currently acting in Kollywood cinema.

Personal life
Weerasinghe was born on 17 December 1953 in Nugegoda, Colombo.

Career
His maiden cinema acting was in 1991 film Wada Barinam Wedak Naha Directed By Late Upali Piyarthna..

In 1995, he produced the film Vijaya Saha Ajay which was directed by Roy de Silva. Then in 1996, he wrote the story and script of the film Bodyguard directed by Upali Piyarathna.

He obtained a diploma from Mumbai drama school and trained in India. His first Kollywood acting came through Suriya Udayan. After the film becomes very popular, he acted in another Tamil film Inda Nimidam directed by R.K Yesu in 2019. He also acted as a police officer in the film Thuppakki En Kadei.

His maiden cinema direction came through 2015 film Singa Machan Charlie where he also produced the film and wrote the script and story.

On 3 November 2015, he was reported to Presidential Commission of Inquiry appointed to Investigate Serious Acts of Fraud, Corruption and Abuse of Power, State resources, and Privileges (PRECIFAC) to record a statement on a matter connected to Sri Lankan airlines.

In 2018, he acted in the television serial Pavathma directed by closest friend Channa Perera.

Filmography

References

External links
 ජනප්‍රිය නළු ලාල් වීරසිංහ දකුණු ඉන්දීය සිනමාපටයක
 Lal Weerasinghe's answer to Cinema fan

Sri Lankan male film actors
Living people
1953 births